Project Elephant  was launched in 1992 by the Government of India Ministry of Environment and Forests to provide financial and technical support to wildlife management efforts by states for their free-ranging populations of wild Asian Elephants. The project aims to ensure the long-term survival of the population of elephants in their natural habitats by protecting them, their habitats and migration corridors. Other goals of Project Elephant are supporting the research of the ecology and management of elephants, creating awareness of conservation among local people, providing improved veterinary care for captive elephants.

Aims
Project Elephant (PE) was launched by the Government of India in the year 1992 as a Centrally Sponsored Scheme with following objectives:
 To protect elephants, their habitat and corridors.
 To address issues of man-animal conflict.
 Welfare of captive elephants
 to promote not to harm elephants for their tusks.

Activities
Financial support is being provided to major elephant bearing States in the country. The Project is being mainly implemented in 16 States / UTs, viz. Andhra Pradesh, Arunachal Pradesh, Assam, Chhattisgarh, Jharkhand, Karnataka, Kerala, Maharashtra, Meghalaya, Nagaland, Orissa, Tamil Nadu, Tripura, Uttarakhand, Uttar Pradesh, West Bengal.  Main activities under the Project are as follows:
 Ecological restoration of existing natural habitats and migratory routes of elephants are built better than before;

 Development of scientific and planned management for conservation of elephant habitats and viable population of Wild Asiatic elephants in India;
 Promotion of measures for mitigation of man-elephant conflict in crucial habitats and moderating pressures of human and domestic stock activities in crucial elephant habitats;
 Strengthening of measures for the protection of Wild elephants from poachers and unnatural causes of death;
 Research on Elephant management related issues;
 Public education and awareness programs;
 Eco-development
 Veterinary care
 Elephant Rehabilitation/Rescue Centers

As of 2010, 32 Elephant Reserves (ERs) extending over about  have been formally notified by various State Governments. The list of Elephant Reserves with area and elephant population is as follows:

Enumeration
The first exclusive exercise for enumeration of wild elephants in the ERs was conducted during February to May 2005. This exercise also sought to experiment with two sampling methods, viz. Block sampling and Line transect-Dung Count. PE arranged for training of trainers and also issued detailed guidelines to the chief wildlife wardens and the field coordinators. Total population of elephants in 2005 was nearly 21,200. The latest census carried out in 2012 put elephant numbers between 28,785and 31,368.

Monitoring against poaching
Project Elephant has been formally implementing MIKE (Monitoring of Illegal Killing of Elephants) programme of CITES in 10 ERs since January 2004. It is mandated by COP resolution of CITES. Project Elephant was started in South Asia in 2003 with the following purposes:

 To measure levels and trends in illegal hunting of elephants.
 To determine changes in these trends over time.
 To determine the factors causing or associated with these changes and to try and assess in particular to what extent observed trends are a result of any decisions taken by the Conference of the Parties to CITES.

Data are collected from all sites on monthly basis in specified MIKE patrol form and submitted to Sub-Regional Support Office for South Asia Programme in Delhi who are assisting Ministry in implementation of the programme.

Research
PE did a 36-months research (2003-04 to 2006-07) with the help of the Central Rice Research Institute (CRRI), Cuttack, for developing high yielding varieties of paddy not relished by elephants; developing elephant-proof storage bins for food grains; and developing elephant repellents. The project is being carried out at the CRRI's research stations in Orissa and Assam. Two projects (2003-04 to 2006-07) with the help of the Assam Agricultural University on "Disease management in captive elephants" and "Anatomical studies on the Asian elephant" were conducted. PE entrusted WII with a small project (2004-05 to 2005-06) to study the impact of the relocation of the Gujjar on the flora and fauna of Rajaji National Park and with the Indian Statistical Institute helped the West Bengal Forest Department carry out a sample-based enumeration of elephants during 2005.

PE has also imbibed the use of eco-tourism for generating extra revenue for the welfare of captive breeding programmes for elephants. PE has been organizing regular refresher courses for veterinarians dealing with wild and domesticated elephants at Kerala Agricultural University, Thrissur and Assam Agricultural University, Guwahati. PE has initiated a programme for registration of domesticated elephants by using microchips. More than 1000 elephants have been microchipped so far in Assam, Arunachal Pradesh, West Bengal, Andaman & Nicobar and Delhi etc. PE has organized necessary training for this purpose and also arranged for supply of standard microchips and readers to all the States known to possess domesticated elephants.

More about PE
 PE has produced a 58 minutes video-documentary "Living with the Giants" on elephant conservation in India

See also
Mela shikar
Khedda
Project Tiger
Project Dolphin (India)

References

Wildlife conservation in India
Conservation-reliant species
Elephant conservation
Conservation projects
Elephants in India